Kiester's emo skink or Ponape skink (Emoia ponapea) is a species of lizard in the family Scincidae occurring in Micronesia.

References

Emoia
Reptiles described in 1982
Taxa named by A. Ross Kiester